Kemayoran Station (KMO) is a railway station located at South Gunung Sahari, Kemayoran, Central Jakarta, Indonesia. This station is located between Pasar Senen railway station in the south and Rajawali railway station in the north. The station is a stoppage for Jakarta metro commuter rail.

History

The station is located on the former BOSM line north of Pasar Senen station, at the eastern end of the Weltevreden region. This station is named after the name of the surrounding residential area, established in the early 20th century. The station and track were taken over by Maatschappij tot Exploitatie van Staatsspoorwegen in 1898.

Since being taken over by SS, Kemayoran station was later developed by SS. With the operation of the electric locomotive and electric train (KRL) on the Batavia-Buitenzorg line in 1925, SS then planned the construction of a double track in almost all Jakarta crossings since 1926. As a first step, the first double track on the Batavia line was between Kemayoran – Batavia and Sawah Besar – Weltevreden. In fact, the reshuffle was also carried out on the route to Tanjung Priok after the inauguration of the new station in 1925. According to Reitsma (1920), the road plot between Rajawali–Kemayoran is the quadruple-track railway in Indonesia.

Building and layout 

This station has four railway lines. The north emplacement is a quadruple-track, while the south emplacement is a double track. Line 1 is a straight track heading towards Pasar Senen–Jatinegara, line 2 is a straight track towards Rajawali–Kampung Bandan, line 3 is a straight track from Tanjung Priuk–Ancol, and line 4 is a straight track towards Ancol–Tanjung Priuk.

Services
Starting 8 June 2019, all local train trips serving the Jakarta-Cikampek-Purwakarta pp route (Cilamaya Ekspres, Walahar Ekspres, and Jatiluhur/Lokal CKP) don't stop at this station. Automatically, since then this station has only served KRL Commuterline trips.

The following is a list of train services at the Kemayoran Station.

Passenger services 
 KAI Commuter
  Cikarang Loop Line (Full Racket)

Supporting transportation

References

External links

Central Jakarta
Railway stations in Jakarta